Elections to Wiltshire County Council were held on 5 May 2005, with the whole council up for election. They proved to be the last to the original county council, as the elections four years later were the first to its successor, the new Wiltshire Council unitary authority.

Most electoral divisions had boundary changes, and several were new, including three new two-member divisions, in Salisbury and Trowbridge.

As with other county elections in England, these local elections in Wiltshire took place on the same day as the 2005 United Kingdom general election.  The previous 2001 Wiltshire Council election, had also coincided with the 2001 general election.

The result was that the Conservatives held onto control.

Results

|}

Results by divisions

Aldbourne and Ramsbury

Alderbury

Amesbury

Avon and Pewsey

Bedwyn and Colingbourne

Bourne and Woodford Valley

Box, Colerne, and Lacock

Bradford on Avon

Bromham and Potterne

Calne

Calne and Without

Chalke and Nadder Valley

Chippenham Central

Chippenham North

Chippenham Pewsham

Chippenham West

Corsham

Cricklade and Purton

Devizes North

Devizes South

Downton and Ebble Valley

Durrington and Bulford

Holt and Paxcroft

Kington

Lavington and Cannings

Malmesbury

Manor Vale

Marlborough

Melksham Central

Melksham Without

Mere and Tisbury

Minety

Salisbury East

Salisbury South

Salisbury West

Tidworth and Ludgershall

Trowbridge East

Trowbridge West

Warminster East and Wylye

Warminster West

Westbury Ham and Dilton

Westbury Laverton and Shearwater

Whorwellsdown Hundred

Wilton and Wylye

Wootton Bassett North

Wootton Bassett South

By-elections between 2005 and 2009

Warminster West

Trowbridge East

Holt and Paxcroft

References
Declaration of Wiltshire County Council Election Results, published 6 May 2005
Results at westwiltshire.gov.uk
Results at keele.ac.uk
Colin Rallings, Michael Thrasher, Wiltshire County Council election Results 1973–2005 at electionscentre.co.uk

2005
Wiltshire
2000s in Wiltshire